Sterling Void (born 1964) is an American house musician.

Biography
Void was an early innovator in the Chicago house music scene. He is mostly known for his song with Paris Brightledge called "It's All Right" released in 1987 on D.J. International Records. In 1988, he released another successful track called "Runaway Girl".

In 1989, "It's All Right" gained greater exposure when it was covered by Pet Shop Boys for their Introspective album and released as a single. Sterling Void himself was tapped to do a remix of this production. Furthermore, the Pet Shop Boys version led to the original version by Sterling Void being re-issued and it eventually reached number 53 in the UK singles chart.

In the 2010s, Sterling Void has released new records. In 2012, he released a track featuring Questions called "Vibes" on Edit Records. The same year he produced a song called "Rise" with Layla on the vocals, and another track with Trevor Mako called "Hold On". In 2013, he released the song "Tell Me" with the vocalist Jérome.

References

American house musicians
American DJs
House musicians
Record producers from Illinois
Living people
Musicians from Chicago
DJs from Chicago
Electronic dance music DJs
1964 births